"Everything Is Awesome" (stylized as "Everything Is AWESOME!!!") is a song by Canadian indie pop duo Tegan and Sara, featuring American comedy trio the Lonely Island. As the theme song to the 2014 Warner Bros. Pictures film The Lego Movie, it was written by Shawn Patterson, Joshua Bartholomew, Lisa Harriton, and the Lonely Island. The single and pop version featured in the end credits of the movie were produced by Mark Mothersbaugh.

The version of "Everything Is Awesome" featured in The Lego Movie and promotional material for the movie was produced by Joshua Bartholomew and performed by Bartholomew and Lisa Harriton.

On January 26, 2014, the song received its first US radio airplay via Anything Anything with Rich Russo on the WXPK, WRAT and WDHA radio stations.

Music video
The music video features Lego versions of Tegan and Sara as well as the Lonely Island's Akiva Schaffer, Andy Samberg and Jorma Taccone. Parts of the video were made using brickfilming.

Reception

Commercial performance

"Everything Is Awesome" debuted at No. 11 on the Dance/Electronic Songs chart, with 34,000 downloads in its first week. It also charted at No. 11 on the Irish charts, and peaked at No. 35 on the Canadian Hot 100. The song spent six consecutive weeks on the UK Singles and thirty-one on the UK Indie, peaking on both charts in early March at No. 17 and No. 2, respectively. In the US Billboard Hot 100, the song charted No. 57. The single had sold 418,000 copies in the United States by the end of June, 2014, and became Gold certified at the end of that year. , it was certified Platinum, having sold more than  units since its release.

Oscars performance
As one of the songs nominated for Best Original Song at the 2015 Oscars, "Everything Is Awesome" was performed as a large-scale musical number featuring not only Tegan and Sara and the Lonely Island, but also on-stage appearances by Mothersbaugh (paying homage to his 1970s group Devo by wearing a LEGO version of the distinctive Devo energy dome), DJ Questlove, and comic actor Will Arnett dressed as Batman (in the film, Arnett provides the voice of Batman and sings the mocking heavy metal composition "Untitled Self Portrait", an excerpt of which was incorporated into the "Everything Is Awesome" performance). According to LEGO Movie co-director Christopher Miller, for this on-stage appearance, Arnett wore the Batman costume originally worn by Val Kilmer in the 1995 film Batman Forever. Arnett also lip-synced to the song on the Reality TV Show Lip Sync Battle, while dressed as Emmet, the character voiced by Chris Pratt in The Lego Movie.

Awards and nominations
 Nominated for Best Original Song at the 87th Academy Awards
 Nominated for a Grammy Award for Best Song Written for Visual Media
 Nominated for a Critics' Choice Movie Award for Best Song
 2014 Denver Film Critics Society for Best Original Song
 Nominated for a 2014 Georgia Film Critics Association for Best Original Song
 2014 Hollywood Music In Media Award for Song - Animated Film
 2014 Houston Film Critics Society for Best Original Song
 2015 Talk Film Society Awards for Best Original Song
 2014 Iowa Film Critics for Best Original Song
 Phoenix Film Critics Society Awards 2014 for Best Original Song
 Nominated for a Satellite Award for Best Original Song
 Variety Artisans Award

Charts and certifications

Weekly charts

Year-end

Certifications

Legacy 
This song had been used in other works in the Lego franchise:
 A version appears in The Lego Batman Movie, performed by Richard Cheese and Lounge Against the Machine.
 In January 2019, the song was re-used in a music video to promote The Lego Movie 2: The Second Part, whereas original characters and new characters were shown dancing to the song. A 360 degree version was also made.
 A ukulele-driven "tween remix" with new verses by Garfunkel and Oates is featured in The Lego Movie 2: The Second Part. 
 Also in The Lego Movie 2, the characters sing a rather sad reprise of the song entitled "Everything's Not Awesome" (US)/"Everything is Awful" (UK) at the falling point of the film.
 The Forza Horizon 4 expansion Lego Speed Champions added an in-game radio station called Radio Awesome, which has "Everything Is Awesome" as its only song.
 In July 2014, the song was re-used in a video of Greenpeace to promote their petition calling on The Lego Group to drop its partnership with Shell.
In 2021, the Lego set Everyone Is Awesome was released in the colours of the LGBT rainbow flag, trans pride flag, and black and brown representing LGBT people of color. It was the first Lego set to represent the LGBT community.

References

External links
 YouTube music video
 Oscars live performance
 SoundCloud track

Tegan and Sara songs
The Lonely Island songs
2014 songs
2014 singles
Songs written for films
The Lego Movie (franchise)
Lego music
Techno songs
Pop songs
Synth-pop songs